= Irving Bush (trumpeter) =

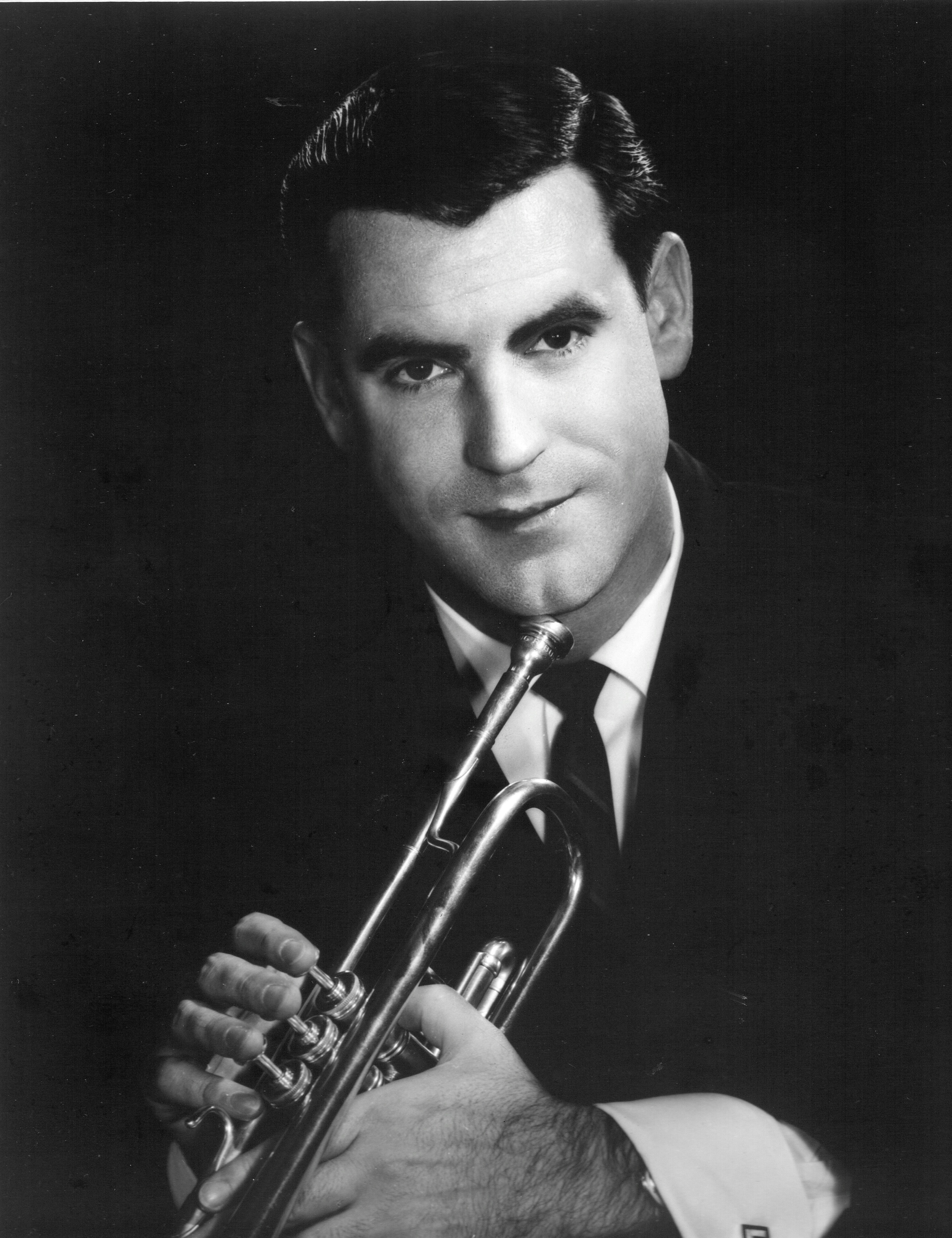
Irving R. Bush (date unknown)

Irving Russell Bush (7 April 1930 – 8 January 2009) was an American musician, best known for his work as a trumpeter. He played with numerous jazz bands, dance bands, studio, TV, and recording bands and orchestras, and in particular with Nat King Cole.

Bush had been on the music staff at the University of Southern California and California State University, Los Angeles and was a permanent member of the Los Angeles Philharmonic Orchestra from 1962 to 1982. Later, he functioned as the personnel manager for the same orchestra. He has authored several books on trumpet like Trumpet Players Blow with Good Vibrations, and has had several compositions recorded and published. In his spare moments, he manufactured trumpet mouthpieces and conducted clinics on trumpet and related subjects. Bush decided it would be appropriate to commemorate the Bicentennial year utilizing his specialty, the trumpet.

== Discography ==
- Trumpet player:
  - Trumpet and Drum
  - Los Angeles Philharmonic, joining the orchestra for the 1962-63 season
- Artistic trumpet technique and study:
  - Irving R. Bush Mouthpieces
